La vita è bella  or variant thereof, may refer to:

 La vita è bella (1997 film), 1997 Italian film
 "La vita è bella" (song) (1997 song), title song to the 1997 film
 La vita è bella (soundtrack), soundtrack album for the 1997 film, see Life Is Beautiful (soundtrack)
 La vita è bella (1979 film) aka Жизнь прекрасна, 1979 Italian-Soviet film

See also
 Bella Vita (disambiguation)
 La Vie est Belle (disambiguation)
 Life is Beautiful (disambiguation)